Oltinkol or Oltinkoʻl may refer to the following places in Uzbekistan:

Oltinkoʻl, Andijan Region
Oltinkoʻl District, Andijan Region
Oltinkoʻl, Karakalpakstan